Temple Sinai is a historic Reform Jewish congregation in New Orleans, Louisiana, United States. It is Louisiana's largest Jewish congregation, and its oldest Reform congregation.

History
Temple Sinai was founded in 1870. The original temple building completed in 1872. It was located at Carondelet Street between Delord Street and Calliope Street. It was used for the initial site of Southern University.

Maximilian Heller was the temple's rabbi from 1887 until his retirement in 1927.

In 1928, Temple Sinai moved Uptown to St. Charles Avenue and Calhoun Street, where a new temple was completed.

The old building was sold to the Knights of Pythias. In the 1930s the Motion Picture Advertising Company purchased the old temple building and remodeled it for its headquarters. It was demolished in 1977 over the objections of preservationists after a court ruling.

Temple Sinai is Louisiana's largest Jewish congregation, and its oldest Reform congregation. The rabbi is Daniel Sherman and the cantor is Joel Colman.

Gallery

References

Reform synagogues in Louisiana
Religious buildings and structures in New Orleans
Former synagogues in the United States
Synagogues completed in 1872
Synagogues completed in 1928
Byzantine Revival synagogues
Synagogues in New Orleans